Brett Boyd (born 28 March 1972) is an Australian former professional rugby league footballer who played for Canberra, Penrith and North Queensland.

Biography

In his first season in 1991 he appeared in 13 first-grade games for Canberra, including three finals. He featured in Canberra's preliminary final win over North Sydney, but wasn't used in the grand final loss to Penrith, the club he went on to join in the 1992 season.

Having been an understudy to Steve Walters at Canberra, he was the first choice hooker at Penrith, playing 93 first-grade games in seven seasons.

In 1999 and 2000 he played at North Queensland, under his former Canberra coach Tim Sheens.

References

External links
Brett Boyd at Rugby League project

1972 births
Living people
Australian rugby league players
Canberra Raiders players
North Queensland Cowboys players
Penrith Panthers players
Rugby league hookers
Rugby league players from Goulburn, New South Wales